Barrydale is a village located on the border of the Overberg and Klein Karoo regions of the Western Cape Province in South Africa. It was named after Joseph Barry, a well known merchant of the 19th century. It is situated at the northern end of the Tradouw's pass which winds its way through the mountains to Swellendam.

History
Barrydale's history dates back to the early 18th century when farmers moved into the area looking for fertile arable land with water. The community built their church on a spot where the R62 and R324 roads meet. In the days before the church was built there were a number of nagmaal houses (houses where Holy Communion could be celebrated) and a school, but not much else.  The Dutch Reformed Community of Barrydale came into being in 1878 when land was purchased to build the church.

As the farmers in the area were encouraged to plant vineyards and orchards, it was natural that a winery and distillery would eventually be built. In 1940 the Barrydale Koöperatiewe Wynkelder was formed and a distillery established giving rise to the wine industry in the area. Joseph Barry Brandy, produced locally, was voted best brandy in the world in 2003.

Over the years the village grew and eventually a municipality was established in 1921. Today there is an estimated population of ~4100 permanent residents.  The population increases dramatically in the tourist season, with visitors drawn by arts and crafts displays including textiles, jewellery and African souvenirs.

Climate
Barrydale has a temperate climate of warm, dry summers with averages of 25°C occasionally up to 35°C, and mild, wet winters when the temperature occasionally dips to around -1°C accompanied by light frosts.

The warm temperate climate is perfect for the growth of various fruit trees with numerous orchards on the fertile soils of the Tradouw Valley. Apples, pears and oranges are harvested in the winter and crops of apricots, figs, cling peaches and grapes in the summer.

Culture
The town still shows the legacy of the apartheid era when it was divided into two to separate whites from non-whites, a large proportion of which are direct descendants of the indigenous Khoisan tribe. Barrydale is culturally diverse for a small village with English- and Afrikaans-speaking inhabitants as well as a substantial European expatriate community including French, German, Spanish and Italian residents. 

The annual Barrydale Spring Festival in October is an important event on the town's calendar. The Joseph Barry Tradouw Pass Half Marathon attracts a large number of runners who compete over a 21 km course through the pass.

Flora and fauna

Barrydale and the surrounding area is rich in species diversity with abundant wildlife such as baboons, genets, mongooses, klipspringer (small khaki-coloured antelope often seen perched on rocks), and rock hyraxes, known locally as dassies (smaller relatives of the elephant).  More elusive animals, such as porcupines, aardvarks, jackals, otters and the reclusive leopards, are occasionally seen in the mountains. Reptiles are common, especially snakes, with a few poisonous species such as puff adder, boomslang (tree snake) and Cape cobra.

The area is also home to numerous bird species such as the Cape eagle-owl, hadeda ibis, grey heron, sunbird (these often have iridescent plumage), fiscal shrike which impales its prey on acacia thorns or barbed wire, and black eagles often seen soaring high overhead on the thermals.

The area has many rare plant species, notably the fynbos flora on the slopes of the Langeberg mountain range in the south, and succulent-dominated Karroid flora to the north. There are many private and state reserves in the area such as the Grootvadersbosch Nature Reserve.

Churches in Barrydale
Like in many other South African cities and villages there are church buildings of different denominations.

References

External links 

 Useful knowledge with some good photos.
 News from Barrydale online, accommodation, amenities etc
 Barrydale accommodation and business directory.
 Eponymous website with interesting facts.
 Wine route encompassing the Breede River Valley and the Klein Karoo.
 Accommodation list, local artists and map of area.
 History of Barrydale

Populated places in the Swellendam Local Municipality